Eduardo Fabián Smith Chávez (born 23 February 1966) is a retired Ecuadorian football midfielder. He was a member of the Ecuador national football team at the 1997 Copa América, and obtained twelve caps during his career.

References

External links

1966 births
Living people
Sportspeople from Guayaquil
Association football midfielders
Ecuadorian footballers
Ecuador international footballers
1997 Copa América players
Barcelona S.C. footballers
C.S. Emelec footballers